Protests against old-growth logging in the southern Vancouver Island region of British Columbia, Canada escalated through later 2020 and into 2021. These events, many coalescing around the Fairy Creek watershed northeast of Port Renfrew, represent a critical moment in BC's recurring history of conflict related to ecological values and the forest industry, recalling the Clayoquot Protests (or "War in the Woods") of the early 1990s. It has been described as "one of the largest [acts of] civil disobedience in Canadian history," with over 1,000 protesters arrested on the site as of February 11th, 2022.

Background 
In August 2020, protests against old growth logging began to escalate in remaining sensitive watershed areas in southern Vancouver Island. Precipitating events included the release in Fall 2020 of a major report and recommendations related to managing and protecting old growth forests in British Columbia and subsequent delay in implementation of the report recommendations, together with increased logging activity in sensitive old growth areas of South Vancouver Island, including the Fairy Creek Watershed by Teal Jones, a forestry company based in Nanaimo. None of Teal Jones' approved harvesting, and very little planned harvesting, is within the Fairy Creek watershed. The large majority of the Fairy Creek watershed is already protected by an Old Growth Management Area (OGMA) and a Wildlife Habitat Area (WHA).

Indigenous peoples in the region 
The Fairy Creek Watershed is in Pacheedaht First Nation territory. Pacheedaht elected leadership distanced itself from logging protest activity in 2021, citing their right to manage territorial resources within their resource stewardship plan. Pacheedaht First Nation entered into a forest revenue agreement with the BC government in 2017. In terms of stewardship, First Nations involved in the forestry industry may exceed provincial logging and replanting standards while relying on forestry activities to build and diversify their economies; through forest revenues Pacheedaht First Nation has purchased businesses and fee simple land in its territory, buying lands back from private developers. In return for revenue sharing over a three-year term, the agreement requires the Nation not to support or participate in any acts that interfere with provincially authorized forest activities, and requires the Nation to support the provincial government in seeking to resolve actions taken by members that are seen to be inconsistent with the agreement.  

However, as the direct descendant from the family line claimed as the hereditary decision-makers or speakers for the territory, Pacheedaht Elder Bill Jones supported protest activity, speaking for careful stewardship of the Fairy Creek Watershed, and against the destruction of remaining sacred places for short term gain. Leaders from Tsleil-Waututh Nation travelled to Fairy Creek in Pacheedaht territory on May 29 to show their support. On June 4, 2021, Huu-ay-aht, Ditidaht, and Pacheedaht First Nations signed the Hišuk ma c̕awak Declaration to take back their power over their ḥahahuułi (traditional territories), and on the following day gave formal notice to the Province of B.C. to defer old-growth logging for two years in the Fairy Creek and the Central Walbran areas while the Nations prepare their stewardship plans. Doug White (Kwulasultun), former chief and councillor of Snuneymuxw First Nation, a practicing lawyer and chairman of the BC First Nations Justice Council, situated the Hišuk ma c̕awak Declaration in the broader context of Aboriginal title in BC, in relation to Delgamuukw v. British Columbia, the Tŝilhqot’in decision, and the United Nations Declaration on the Rights of Indigenous Peoples (UNDRIP), asserting that the existing forestry regime of tenure and permits is inconsistent with Aboriginal rights, title and implementation of decision-making.

Ecology and wildlife 

On May 31, 2021, the B.C. Ministry of Forests, Lands, Natural Resource Operations and Rural Development announced that reported sightings of endangered western screech owls in the area had been confirmed. Radar surveys by the B.C. Wilderness Committee in July 2021 also reported over 240 sightings of endangered marbled murrelets in the Fairy Creek watershed and surrounding areas.

Several instances of the rare lichen old-growth specklebelly (Pseudocyphellaria rainierensis) have been found on trees within Fairy Creek. The lichen's presence is due to the nutrient hotspots created by old-growth yellow cedar in the watershed.

Blockades and protests 
In spite of COVID-19 pandemic conditions, protest activity was sustained through Spring 2021, with social media calls going out for reinforcements as police removed activists from various camps and sites. Arrests and removals were made more difficult by what one visiting journalist described as highly inventive approaches taken by the protestors, who in many cases constructed "dragons" made of pipe and concrete to more effectively chain to equipment or roadbed ("sleeping dragons"), or who cantilevered themselves in high places where it would be difficult and time-consuming to extract them ("flying dragons").

On May 22, 2021, a visit to Fairy Creek by Tzeporah Berman, veteran of the Clayoquot protests of the 1990's and international programs director with Stand.Earth, ended in arrest for defying an exclusion zone being enforced by the RCMP. Days later, scores of senior citizens joined protestors at Fairy Creek at the invitation of Pacheedaht Elder Bill Jones, passing unchallenged through the RCMP blockade. Protests were also held in locations in Greater Victoria, including at the constituency office of British Columbia Premier John Horgan, whose electoral riding area includes disputed old-growth forest and overlaps Pacheedaht territory.

By late August 2021, measured in terms of arrests, the Fairy Creek protests approached Canada’s civil disobedience record, a threshold set in 1993 when 856 people were arrested during the “war in the woods” over old-growth logging in Clayoquot Sound, and one of the biggest acts of civil disobedience in Canadian history.

On September 29, the Supreme Court of British Columbia rejected the extension of the injunction against the protesters requested by the logging company.

Media and protest coverage 
On May 19, the RCMP arrested a journalist attempting to cover the protests, alleging the journalist has been obstructing the work of the logging company. However, videos posted on social media showed the journalist in question asking police what he was obstructing without answer just prior to the arrest.

In May the Rainforest Flying Squad, an environmentalist group focused on the Fairy Creek Blockade, alleged that Instagram deleted their account after they posted a video showing aggressive RCMP arrests of protestors. The group's account was restored the next day, with a Facebook spokesperson stating that it had been deleted in error.

On May 26, the Canadian Association of Journalists, the Aboriginal Peoples Television Network, The Narwhal, along with several other media outlets, announced that they would be suing the RCMP over restrictions the police were imposing on media access to the protests. On July 20, 2021, the court action, initiated by a coalition of press groups including the Canadian Association of Journalists, Ricochet Media, Capital Daily Victoria, The Narwhal, Canada’s National Observer, APTN News, The Discourse, Indiginews and Canadian Journalists for Free Expression, received a favourable decision in the British Columbia Supreme Court. The media groups' application was granted to add a clause to the injunction order granted to logging company Teal Jones in April, instructing the RCMP not to interfere with media access absent a bona fide operational reason for doing so.

Arrests and policing 

On May 28, 2021, the RCMP arrested every protestor at the Waterfall Blockade, except for one, stating that they had been unable to arrest that protestor safely. The next day, several hundred protestors marched on the site, re-establishing the blockade. On August 9, 2021, the one year anniversary of the blockade, the RCMP raided Fairy Creek headquarters for the first time. Officers notified protestors they had 24 hours to evacuate the area, however witnesses reported the RCMP began enforcement before the injunction period ended. Over 20 protestors were arrested and the nearby Heli Camp was disbanded soon after. As of February 11, 2022, over 1,000 protestors had been arrested.

In addition to the July 2021 court action against the RCMP initiated by media outlets, Rainforest Flying Squad reported individual journalists and protestors had submitted over a dozen complaints against the RCMP by August 2021. Complaints included excessive force, confiscation of food and water, and unlawful apprehension of personal possessions, vehicles, and items providing media access, including a satellite dish. The RCMP came under further criticism when a number of its officers were seen wearing thin blue line patches while on duty at the site, despite official RCMP guidelines forbidding the symbol.

Public awareness and engagement 

Social media campaigns and online fundraising campaigns mobilized public opinion and resources related to blockades and protests at Fairy Creek and in the forests of South Vancouver Island at a time in the COVID-19 pandemic when travel in British Columbia was largely restricted to essential travel only, within local health authorities.

In Spring 2021, actor and photographer Cole Sprouse supported protestors by visiting and sharing a photo essay documenting Fairy Creek old-growth and protest activity. Celebrity support for protestors was also offered by actor Mark Ruffalo and former wrestler Hulk Hogan, and musicians Bruce Cockburn and Midnight Oil, who gave protest organizers permission to use their songs on social media. In June 2021Vogue magazine also carried a photo essay featuring land defenders at Fairy Creek.

On May 24, 2021, poet, writer, and publisher Gary Geddes crossed the police line at Waterfall Camp to be arrested and raise awareness of the protests.

On July 1, 2021, PBS Digital Studios added a video called Terra explaining unique aspects of the temperate rainforest in Fairy Creek, including its mycorrhizal network and canopy soils which are still not fully understood. The call for conservation, narrated by Joe Hanson (host of It’s Okay To Be Smart), was uploaded to the PBS website and YouTube channel as part of the Overview series.

See also 
2020 Canadian pipeline and railway protests

Further reading 
 Brownstein, David. 2021 Dec 22. "What is the History of Logging Protests in British Columbia?" Network in Canadian History & Environment. 
 Auger, Odette. 2021 May 28. "Relationship to the land is an ancestral duty, say Indigenous land defenders." Watershed Sentinel.
 Canadian Association of Journalists. 2021 May 18. "CAJ calls on courts to limit RCMP powers when granting injunctions."
 Rainforest Flying Squad 
 Universal Wildlands BC Logging Reports

References 

Logging in Canada
Environmental protests in Canada
History of British Columbia
Vancouver Island
Indigenous rights in Canada
Environmental justice
Nonviolent occupation
Indigenous peoples and the environment
Land defender